Restructured steak is a catch-all term to describe a class of imitation beef steaks made from smaller pieces of beef fused together by a binding agent. Its development started from the 1970s. Restructured steak is sometimes made using cheaper cuts of beef such as the hind quarter or fore quarter of beef.

Allowed food-grade agents include:
 Sodium chloride (table salt) and phosphate salts. Salt can prevent microbiological growth and make myosin-type proteins more soluble. The allowed amount of phosphate in end products is 0.5% in the United States. It increases the emulsification of fat.
 Animal blood plasma
 Alginate: Sodium alginate forms an adhesive gel in the presence of Ca2+ ion.
 Transglutaminase: an enzyme that helps the forming of cross-binding proteins.

Problems 
Oxidation and food poisoning are the two most serious issues generally associated with restructured steak.  To reduce the risk of food poisoning, restructured steaks should always be cooked until well-done.

References

Beef
Imitation foods
steak